"The Love of Three Oranges" is the third Christmas episode of the British comedy series Dad's Army. It was originally transmitted on 26 December 1976.

Synopsis
A church bazaar is organized for the "Comforts for the Troops Fund".  Hodges intends to auction three oranges, and Mainwaring is determined to get hold of one for Mrs Mainwaring.

Plot
The platoon are parading in their snow camouflage suits so they can blend in with the snow, if there was any. Jones' glasses are completely white except for two small, dark holes in the middle because he has highly coloured eyes. He also has cotton wool pushed up his nostrils, because he claims that his nostrils flare.  Pike is wearing a white sheet over his head because his mother would not let him put whitewash on his face.  Frazer is dressed in his mother's wedding dress (it was all he could find) and Godfrey is wearing a pierrot costume he wore, complete with pompoms, for the Army and Navy Stores Christmas party, where they made up a troupe called the Gay Gondoliers.

The vicar and the verger interrupt the parade and inform Mainwaring of a church bazaar they are holding for the Comforts for the Troops Fund.  Mainwaring naturally takes charge, and forms a small executive committee. Godfrey will provide chutney and homemade wine, Frazer will draw silhouettes, Mrs Pike will run a jumble sale, Mrs Fox will perform fortune-telling in a gypsy tent, Mrs Mainwaring will provide lampshades, Mrs Yeatman will organise the tombola, and Jones will auction a monster brawn.  Hodges shoves his oar in by declaring he will auction three oranges, much to the committee's surprise.

The bazaar opens, and Mrs Mainwaring's lampshade stall is empty, and Mainwaring tells Wilson that Mrs Mainwaring had an unfortunate incident with the bath (their bath had been recently enamelled, and the enamel paint came off in one long strip, making an enamel skirt around her as she prepared to take a bath), and she won't be coming. Mainwaring admits to Wilson that he would only be embarrassed by the lampshades anyway, but it turns out that Pike picked them up from Mainwaring's house.

Jones and Pike carry Jones's brawn into the yard, as it is melting in the heat. Mainwaring tries to win a bottle of whisky from the tombola stall, but loses out to the Vicar. When he notices the town clerk and some of his men drunk, he confronts Godfrey, who admits that everybody's tasting the wine, but nobody's buying it. A dispatch rider arrives with a message but, when he leaves, his motorcycle runs over Jones' brawn, making it unsellable. Mainwaring finds that Sponge is selling the lampshades as funny hats.

Just as Hodges announces the auction of the oranges, Mainwaring tells Wilson that he must get one of the oranges for Mrs Mainwaring. The Verger overhears and warns Hodges, who resolves to stop Mainwaring. The first orange is sold for 1 shilling to Mrs Yeatman, before Mainwaring had finished bidding. The second orange is withdrawn from the sale because Mainwaring was the only bidder. Wilson tells Pike to buy the orange for Mainwaring. As they end up bidding against one another, the orange eventually sells for an enormous 10 shillings.

Mainwaring brings Jones' section into the office. Mrs Mainwaring rings and tells Pike that she's gone to stay with her sister for the weekend. Pike tells her about the orange, but she promptly slams the phone down.  Mainwaring therefore decides to share the orange with Wilson and Jones' section. Suddenly Hodges comes bursting in and tells Mainwaring that they'll find the orange rather bitter: it's for making marmalade with.

Cast
Arthur Lowe as Captain Mainwaring
John Le Mesurier as Sergeant Wilson
Clive Dunn as Lance Corporal Jones
John Laurie as Private Frazer
Arnold Ridley as Private Godfrey
Ian Lavender as Private Pike
Bill Pertwee as ARP Warden Hodges
Edward Sinclair as The Verger
Frank Williams as The Vicar
Pamela Cundell as Mrs Fox
Janet Davies as Mrs Pike
Olive Mercer as Mrs Yeatman
Joan Cooper as Dolly
Eric Longworth as Claude Gordon, the Town Clerk
Colin Bean as Private Sponge

Notes
The episode must be set prior to 25 June 1941, as Mainwaring refers to 'our Finnish allies'. In the early part of the war the USSR - loosely allied to Germany under the Molotov-Ribbentrop Pact - attacked Finland in the Winter War of 1939-40. As there was little fighting going on in the west that winter (the Phoney War) there was great sympathy for Finland in the UK. On 25 June 1941, the UK declared war on Finland, following Finland's invasion of the USSR along with Germany and her allies (see Continuation War and Operation Barbarossa).
No new series of Dad's Army was made in 1976 as the cast were touring the stage version of the show across the UK, resulting in a Christmas Special being produced instead. This would be the first year since 1971 (when the first feature film of the series was made) that no new series of the show would be produced and transmitted.

Dad's Army special episodes
British Christmas television episodes
1976 British television episodes